Elaphriella wareni is a species of sea snail, a marine gastropod mollusk, in the family Solariellidae.

Distribution
This species occurs in the following locations:
 Coral Sea
 Fiji
 Solomon Islands
 Solomon Islands
 Vanuatu part of the South Pacific Ocean
 Wallis and Futuna Islands

References

Solariellidae